The Warwick Police Department is the primary law enforcement agency in Warwick, Kent County, Rhode Island, United States. It is responsible for most law enforcement within the geographical boundary of City of Warwick, with the exception of:
State parks, which are handled by the Rhode Island Department of Environmental Management (DEM)
Highway patrol, which is handled by the Rhode Island State Police
Patrols in Rhode Island T. F. Green International Airport are handled by Rhode Island State Police and RI Airport police.

Live PD

Warwick Police Department was one of the eight departments around the country being featured on the A&E TB show Live PD. It follows  police officers in the course of their nighttime patrols live, broadcasting select encounters with the public. The officers that have been featured from June 1, 2018 to May 2019:

 Sergeant John Curley (Guest analyst for 2 episodes)
 Officer Jake Elderkin
 Officer Mark Jandreau 
 Officer Tim Lipka
 Officer Jill Marshall
 Sergeant John McAniff 
 Officer Matt Moretti 
 Officer Richard Odell
 Sergeant Jed Pineau
 Officer Aaron Steere and K9 Viking(Retired) and K9 Garry (Current K9)
 Officer TJ Tavares
 Officer Paul Wells and K9 Fox

Crimes
The majority of reported crime in Warwick involves property crime, with an occasional pursuit, assault, as well as domestic violence.

Average Salary
The average police patrol officer salary in Warwick is $57,343 as of October 31, 2018, but the range typically falls between $53,550 and $62,479.

References

Municipal police departments of Rhode Island
Warwick, Rhode Island
1837 establishments in Rhode Island